Lemoa is a railway station in Lemoa, Basque Country, Spain. It is owned by Euskal Trenbide Sarea and operated by Euskotren. It lies on the Bilbao-San Sebastián line.

History 
The station opened as part of the Bilbao-Durango line in 1882. Passenger traffic increased notably after 1913, when an interchange with the interurban Arratia tram was built. A  cement factory adjacent to the station was an important source of freight traffic starting in the 1920s. In December 2004, works on the rebuilding of the station and the removal of a nearby level crossing started. The level crossing was removed in 2006, and the new station opened in 2008.

Services 
The station is served by Euskotren Trena lines E1 and E4. Each of them runs every 30 minutes (in each direction) during weekdays, and every hour during weekends.

References

External links
 

Euskotren Trena stations
Railway stations in Biscay
Railway stations in Spain opened in 1882